This article describes the phonology of the Occitan language.

Consonants 
Below is a consonant chart that covers multiple dialects. Where symbols for consonants occur in pairs, the left represents a voiceless consonant and the right represents a voiced consonant.

 Notes
 In Languedocien:
 the phonemes  indicate three kinds of sounds, depending on what surrounds them:
 a voiced plosive sound  by default
 devoiced to  phrase-finally or before a voiceless sound
 a voiced fricative  when both preceded and followed by voiced continuants (i.e., vowels or ) within the same phrase.
 In Auvergnat and Limousin, and locally in other dialects,
 In Auvergnat, most of the consonants, except , can have a palatalized sound before i and u. Consequently, the consonant phonemes have two kinds of sounds, one being not palatal (by default) and the other being palatal (before i and u):  → ;  → ;  → ;  → ;  → ;  → ;  → ;  → ;  → ;  → ;  → ;  → ;  → ;  → ;  → .
 In one part (and only one part) of Limousin, a transphonologization has occurred:
This feature is shared with Portuguese.

Gascon consonants 
 Gascon shares some traits with Languedocien:
 The phonemes  have the same realization as described above for Languedocien.
It seems possible, however, that the phoneme  never existed in Gascon.
 A glottal fricative sound  is recognized among the dialects of Gascon.
 In one part of Gascon, the palatal affricates   become plosive palatal consonants: .

Vowels

Vowel pronunciation according to position 
{| class="wikitable"
! rowspan="2" | Spelling
! colspan="2" | Stressed
! colspan="2" | Unstressed but not final
! colspan="2" | Unstressed and final
|- style="text-align: center;"
! Pronunciation
! Examples
! Pronunciation
! Examples
! Pronunciation
! Examples
|- style="text-align: center;"
| a
|  or 
| bala, cantaràs, occitan  
veniá  
| | 
| partir 
| 
| companhia 
|- style="text-align: center;"
| e|  or 
| pel  (skin)pèl   (hair)
| 
| esfòrç 
| 
| autre 
|- style="text-align: center;"
| o|  or 
| rascós, informacion esfòrç 
| 
| portal 
| 
| basco 
|}

Note:
 The grapheme , when in final position and after the word's stress, is pronounced  in general (locally:).
 The grapheme  is pronounced  in general (locally:).
 Final  is generally used in loanwords, especially from Catalan, Spanish and Italian.

 General ablaut 
In an unstressed position, some vowels cannot be realized and become more closed vowels:
 The stressed vowel   becomes the unstressed vowel  . For instance (stress underlined): tèrra  → terrassa .
 The stressed vowel   becomes the unstressed vowel  . For instance (stress underlined): còde  → codificar .
 In some local dialects, especially in the Languedocien variety of Guyenne, the stressed vowel   becomes the unstressed vowel  . For instance (stress underlined): bala  → balon .
Javanese also similarly has such vowel rounding, although the penultimate vowel  (< ) could occur before any consonant.
 In Limousin, Auvernhat, Vivaro-Alpine and in most of Provençal (though not in Niçard), the stressed diphthong   becomes the unstressed diphthong  . For instance (stress underlined): sauta  → sautar .
 In Limousin, Auvernhat, Vivaro-Alpine and in most of Provençal (though not in Niçard), the stressed diphthong   becomes the unstressed diphthong  . For instance (stress underlined): laissa  → laissar .

 Vowel changes in Auvergnat 
One typical characteristic of Auvergnat (also a feature of some neighbouring dialects of Vivaro-Alpine) is the transformation of the following phonemes:
 The old phoneme  has become .

In an unstressed position, some vowels cannot be realized and become more closed vowels:
 The stressed vowel   becomes the unstressed vowel  . For instance (stress underlined): tèrra  → terrassa .
 The stressed vowel   becomes the unstressed vowel  . For instance (stress underlined): còde  → codificar .
 In the northern part of Auvergne, the stressed vowel   (unrounded) becomes the unstressed vowel   (rounded). For instance (stress underlined): bala  → balon .
 The stressed diphthong   becomes the unstressed diphthong  . For instance (stress underlined): sauta  → sautar .
 The stressed diphthong   becomes the unstressed diphthong  . For instance (stress underlined): laissa  → laissar .

 Vowel changes in Limousin 

In words of popular formation, the sequences  , when at the end of a syllable, first became  and have now become long vowels, which tends to create new phonemes with a relevant opposition between short vowels and long vowels. The same phenomenon exists in one part of Vivarais, and also occurred in the transition from Old to Middle French.

In an unstressed position, some vowels cannot be realized and become more closed vowels:
 The stressed vowel   becomes the unstressed vowel  . For instance (stress underlined): còde  → codificar .
 The stressed vowel   (unrounded) becomes the unstressed vowel   (rounded). For instance (stress underlined): bala  → balon .
 The stressed diphthong   becomes the unstressed diphthong  . For instance (stress underlined): sauta  → sautar .
 The stressed diphthong   becomes the unstressed diphthong  . For instance (stress underlined): laissa  → laissar .

 Regional variation 

 In all dialects but Languedocien, final  is heavily velarized ("dark l") and therefore usually spelled : especial  / especiau  but especiala  in the feminine (except in Gascon where it stays as especiau).

 Word stress 
Word stress has limited mobility. It can only fall on:
 the last syllable (oxytones or mots aguts 'acute words')
 the penultimate syllable (paroxytones or mots plans 'plain words').
 However, in Niçard, and less commonly in the Cisaupenc dialect of the Occitan Valleys, the stress can also fall on the antepenultimate (third from last) syllable (proparoxytones or mots esdrúchols 'slip words'). These were regarded as irregular stress in the orthography and they marked by diacritics (see below).

These proparoxytones are equivalent to paroxytones in all other dialects. For instance (stress underlined):

The stress is oxytone if the last syllable ending in a consonant or a diphthong ending in -u or -i (occitan /utsiˈta/, verai); while the stress is penultimate if the last syllable ending in a vowel (or vowel + -s) and vowel + -n when in the case of third-person plural verb forms (libre, libres, parlan), the stress is also penultimate when the syllable ending in two different vowels (estatua). Irregular stresses is normally marked orthographically by acutes (á, é, í, ó, ú) and graves (à, è, ò).

 Historical development 
As a Romance language, Occitan developed from Vulgar Latin. Old Occitan (around the eighth through the fourteenth centuries) had a similar pronunciation to present-day Occitan; the major differences were:
 In the early Middle Ages,  between vowels represented the affricate , not yet .
 In early Old Occitan,  represented  in final position.
 Between vowels, the letter  or  represented, for most speech in Occitania, .
 In earlier times, some dialects used  instead of the more common : despite their similarity, this often led to contrasting spellings ( or   vs.  ;  or   vs.  ) before it became  commonly across the language.Société pour l'Étude des Langues Romanes, Revue des langues romanes, 1877, p. 17: 
This still happens today and has spread to the neighbouring Languedocien dialect.
 The phoneme  was exclusively pronounced  (it is now  in intervocalic or final position in some dialects).

 Old Occitan phonology 

 See also 
 Catalan phonology
 Occitan conjugation
 Occitan alphabet

 Notes 

 References 

Balaguer, Claudi & Patrici Pojada: Diccionari Català - Occità / Occitan - CatalanFettuciari, Jòrgi, Guiu Martin & Jaume Pietri: Diccionari Provençau - Francés Bèc, Pèire. (1973). Manuel pratique d’occitan moderne, coll. Connaissance des langues, Paris: Picard.
 Bianchi, Andriu & Alan Viaut. (1995). Fiches de grammaire d’occitan gascon normé, vol. 1. Bordeaux: Presses Universitaires de Bordeaux
 Romieu, Maurici & Andriu Bianchi. (2005). Gramatica de l’occitan gascon contemporanèu, Bordèu: Presses Universitaires de Bordeaux.
 Ronjat, Juli. (1930–1941). Grammaire istorique [sic] des parlers provençaux modernes, 4 vol. [reprint, 1980, Marselha: Laffitte Reprints, 2 vol.].

 Further reading 
Lavalade, Yves. Dictionnaire Occitan - FrançaisOmelhièr, Cristian. Petiòt diccionari Occitan d'Auvèrnhe - Francés''

Occitan language
Languages of France
Italic phonologies

it:Pronuncia dell'occitano